Dallow is an inner area of Luton about a half mile (0.8 km) west of the town centre and a ward of the Borough of Luton, in the ceremonial county of Bedfordshire, England. The extended area along Dallow Road is roughly bounded by Hatters Way to the north, Ashburnham Road to the south, the M1 to the west and Brantwood Road to the east.

History
Some buildings in the area are to become part of Luton's Rothesay Preservation Area.
The land was originally farmland and nearly all the buildings date from the late 19th century through to the 1920s. New enterprises such as Laporte's Chemical Works, the CWS cocoa works, Brown's Timberyard and the Davis gas stove factory were opened and the surrounding area was completed by 1920.

The Edwardian semi-detached houses of Brantwood Road, facing the park have an art deco style whilst those in Ashburnham Road include ornate balconies. The name of Rothesay is part of Luton's heritage, Rothesay Castle being the seat of the Earls and Marquesses of Bute, who stayed at Luton Hoo for many years during the eighteenth century and were also influential landowners.

Demography

Politics
Dallow is part of the larger Dallow ward, which also includes parts of Bury Park. The ward is represented by Cllr Mohammed Ashraf (Labour), Cllr Mohammed Farooq (Labour) and Cllr Tafheen Sharif (Labour).

The ward forms part of the parliamentary constituency of Luton South and the MP is Rachel Hopkins (Labour).

Local Attractions

Local Newspapers
Two weekly newspapers are delivered free to all the houses in Dallow. However they are not specific to Dallow. They are:
 Herald and Post - Delivered every Thursday
 Luton on Sunday- Delivered every Sunday

References

 Luton Borough Council

Areas of Luton
Wards of Luton